Caterina Caselli (born 10 April 1946) is an Italian record producer, music executive, singer and bass player.

Biography
Caselli was born in Modena but grew up in Sassuolo. She started her music career by playing bass in local clubs. 

In 1966 she debuted in the Sanremo Festival with "Nessuno mi può giudicare", a song discarded by Adriano Celentano, scoring a notable success. It sold over one million copies, and was awarded a gold disc. Caselli also had considerable success with an Italian cover of the David McWilliams song "Days of Pearly Spencer" called "Il volto della vita". Her first album, Casco d'oro (Golden Bob), was titled after a nickname given to her by the music press. In 1966 she scored another domestic hit with the song "Perdono”. 

In 1968 Caselli enjoyed further success with a dynamic version of the Paolo Conte-penned tune “Insieme a te non ci sto più". In 2006, Caselli recorded a new version of the song for the soundtrack of the Michele Soavi's neo-noir film The Goodbye Kiss. This version won the David di Donatello Award for Best Song.

In 1970 she married Piero Sugar, head of her music label CGD. Caselli started working with her husband, eventually becoming president of Sugar Music, and retired from her performing career. She discovered and recorded artists such as Andrea Bocelli, Giuni Russo, Elisa, Negramaro and Piccola Orchestra Avion Travel.

In 1983 she was lured out of retirement when she agreed to record "Amico è" with Dario Baldan Bembo. The song peaked at number 5 in the Italian charts.

Discography
1966 - Casco d'oro (CGD, FG 5029)
1967 - Diamoci del tu (CGD, FG 5033)
1970 - Caterina Caselli (CGD, FGS 5080)
1972 - Caterina Caselli (CGD, FGL 5105)
1974 - Primavera (CGD, 69071)
1975 - Una grande emozione (CGD, 69121)
1990 - Amada mia (Sugar Music 508100-1)

References

External links

1946 births
Living people
Musicians from the Province of Modena
Italian women singers
Italian record producers
Italian women record producers
Italian bass guitarists